The princeps pollicis artery, or principal artery of the thumb, arises from the radial artery just as it turns medially towards the deep part of the hand; it descends between the first dorsal interosseous muscle and the oblique head of the adductor pollicis, along the medial side of the first metacarpal bone to the base of the proximal phalanx, where it lies beneath the tendon of the flexor pollicis longus muscle and divides into two branches.

These make their appearance between the medial and lateral insertions of the adductor pollicis, and run along the sides of the thumb, forming an arch on the palmar surface of the distal phalanx, from which branches are distributed to the integument and subcutaneous tissue of the thumb.

As the princeps pollicis has a strong pulse, the thumb should not be used to read pulses in other people, as this may produce false positives.

Additional images

References

External links
  ("Palm of the hand, deep dissection, anterior view")
  ("Dorsum of the hand, deep dissection, posterior view")

Arteries of the upper limb